NA-132 may refer to:

 NA-132 (Lahore-X), a constituency for the National Assembly of Pakistan
 NA-132 (Sheikhupura-II-cum-Nankana Sahib), a former constituency for the National Assembly of Pakistan

National Assembly Constituencies of Pakistan